Vanita is both a surname and a feminine given name. It may refer to:

Ruth Vanita (born 1955), Indian academic
Vicky Vanita (1948–2007), Greek actress
Vanita Gupta (born 1974), American lawyer
Vanita Kayiwa, Ugandan airline transport pilot

Feminine given names